Lilo Mund Borgs (born 1939) is a Chilean diver. She competed in the women's 3 metre springboard event at the 1956 Summer Olympics.

Her brother is diver Günther Mund. Both of Mund's parents were also Olympic divers; Arthur Mund and Margret Borgs competed for Germany at the 1928 Summer Olympics.

Notes

References

External links
 

1939 births
Living people
Chilean female divers
Olympic divers of Chile
Divers at the 1956 Summer Olympics
Sportspeople from Santiago
20th-century Chilean women